Hipodil is a promotional two-track EP by the Bulgarian rock band of the same name in 2002. The EP is widely known by the name of its first track "Skakauec" (Grasshopper). It was the last official release by the band under the Hipodil name and was sent to radio stations.

The song was inspired by an incident on the Wheel of Fortune-style game show Risk pecheli, risk gubi! in 2000. A contestant from Pernik was asked to guess the word "СКА_А_Е_", and after responding in the negative to an offer for a "joker", he answered "скакалец", although his accent made the word sound like  (standard pronunciation is ) - the word turned out to be "скарабей" (scarab, a beetle or an ancient Egyptian artefact).

Track list

Music video 
Two music videos were released for "Skakauec". The first one features scenes such as Svetlio dressed as a grasshopper, a telephone box reading "ТЕУЕФОН" and the band playing the song. The second one shows the band playing dressed as American Indians while factoids about the band pop up on the screen. The version in the music video runs 4:42 and contains extra music cut from the CD version.

References

External links 
 Hipodil at MusicBrainz

2002 singles